Division No. 6, Subd. D is an unorganized subdivision in northeastern Newfoundland, Newfoundland and Labrador, Canada. It is in Division No. 6 on the Bay of Exploits.

According to the 2016 Statistics Canada Census:
Population: 682
% Change (2011-2016): 131.2
Dwellings: 769
Area (km2): 4,228.2
Density (persons per km2): 0.2

However, according to City-Data, there are only 285 residents.

Newfoundland and Labrador subdivisions